Hockey Club Krasnaya Armiya or Red Army, is a Russian junior ice hockey club based in Moscow, Russia. They are members of the Western Conference in the Junior Hockey League (MHL), the junior league of the KHL. The name was chosen by fan vote.

The club has won the Kharlamov Cup twice, in 2010–11 and 2016–17 seasons.

Season-by-season record

Playoffs
 2009–10 — Lost in 1/8 Finals, 2–3 (Irbis)
 2010–11 — Won Kharlamov Cup, 4:0 (Stalnye Lisy)
 2011–12 — Lost in Kharlamov Cup Finals, 1-4 (Omsk Hawks)
 2012–13 — Did not qualify
 2013–14 — Lost in Kharlamov Cup Finals, 3-4 (Spartak)
 2014–15 — Lost in Conference quarterfinals, 0–3 (SKA-1946)
 2015–16 — Lost in Conference quarterfinals, 1-3 (Loko Yaroslavl)
 2016–17 — Won Kharlamov Cup, 4:0 (Reaktor)
 2017–18 — Lost in Conference quarterfinals, 1–3 (Dinamo Saint Petersburg)
 2018–19 — Lost in Conference quarterfinals, 2–3 (Almaz Cherepovets)

Honours

Domestic (MHL)
Kharlamov Cup
 Winners (2): 2010–11, 2016-17
 Runners-up (2): 2011-12, 2013-14

Viacheslav Fetisov Award
Alexey Marchenko: 2010-11

Vladimir Yurzinov Award
Vyacheslav Butsaev: 2010-11

Vitaly Davydov Award
Nikita Gusev (2): 2010-11, 2011-12

International
Junior Club World Cup
 Winners (2): 2011, 2017

See also
HC CSKA Moscow
Zvezda Moscow
MHL

References

External links
Official Website

Junior Hockey League (Russia) teams
HC CSKA Moscow
Military ice hockey teams
CSKA Moscow